Josef Rank (Friedrichsthal, 10 June 1816 – Wien, 27 March 1896) was a German-Austrian writer.

Biography

He learnt philosophy and law in Wien. Shortly after finishing the university he began his literature career. In 1848, he was a member of the German Parliament. Later he moved to Stuttgart, then in 1851  to Majna-Frankfurt. From 1854 to 1859, he lived in Weimar. From 1849 he worked from Nürnberg. Here he served as the editor of Nürnberger Kurir. In 1861, he moved to Wien where he became the secretary of the royal and in 1876 the city theatre. From 1882 to 1885, he edited Heimat.

His works

 Aus dem Böhmerwalde (1843); 
 Neue Geschichten aus dem Böhmerwalde (1847); 
 Eine Mutter vom Lande (1848); 
 Florian (1853, 2 kötet); 
 Geschichten armer Leute (1853); 
 Von Haus zu Haus (1855); 
 Achtspännig (1856, 2 kötet); 
 Aus Dorf und Stadt (1860, 2 kötet); 
 Ein Dorfbrutus (1861, 2 kötet); 
 Im Klosterhof (1875); 
 Der Seelenfänger (1876); 
 Der Hauskobold (1886) 
 Erinnerungen aus meinem Leben (Prague, 1896).

1816 births
1896 deaths
19th-century Austrian male writers